H2Pro is an Israeli startup company that is developing cheaper hydrogen fuel produced by sustainable energy.  Among five finalists, the startup was the only one from Israel to win Shell's New Energy Challenge competition The company was co-founded in 2019 by Prof. Gideon Grader, Prof. Avner Rothschild, Dr. Hen Dotan and Talmon Marco (A co-founder of Viber which was acquired by Rakuten for $900,000,000.). H2Pro has received backing from Microsoft co-founder Bill Gates and from Hong Kong entrepreneur Li Ka-shing. In 2019, Hyundai invested in H2Pro.  More recently ArcelorMittal made a US$5 million investment in H2Pro via it's XCarb™ innovation fund.

Efficiency 
The scientific paper detailing the two-step electrolysis process, on which the company's technology is based, reports an average 98.7% Faradic efficiency–not to be confused with energy conversion efficiency: the electrical energy consumption is 39.9 kWh per kilogram hydrogen, with an additional heat loss of 1.9 kWh per kg hydrogen, not including heat loss to the environment. Out of approximately 33.3 kWh of usable energy per kg hydrogen, this gives the two-step electrolysis process a theoretical maximum energy efficiency of approximately 79.6 percent for storing electrical energy in hydrogen. The energy then needs to be converted back to electricity, which in practice, using fuel cells, results in further energy losses.

References 

2019 establishments
Sustainable energy
Sustainability
Hydrogen
he:H2Pro (חברה)